The 1983–84 NBA season was the SuperSonics' 17th season in the NBA.

In the playoffs, the SuperSonics lost to the Dallas Mavericks in five games in the First Round.

Draft picks

Roster

Regular season

Season standings

z – clinched division title
y – clinched division title
x – clinched playoff spot

Record vs. opponents

Game log

Playoffs

|- align="center" bgcolor="#ffcccc"
| 1
| April 17
| @ Dallas
| L 86–88
| Gus Williams (37)
| Danny Vranes (8)
| Gus Williams (8)
| Reunion Arena17,007
| 0–1
|- align="center" bgcolor="#ccffcc"
| 2
| April 19
| @ Dallas
| W 95–92
| Tom Chambers (30)
| Jack Sikma (10)
| Gus Williams (11)
| Reunion Arena17,007
| 1–1
|- align="center" bgcolor="#ccffcc"
| 3
| April 21
| Dallas
| W 104–94
| Jack Sikma (23)
| Jack Sikma (17)
| Gus Williams (15)
| Seattle Center Coliseum10,229
| 2–1
|- align="center" bgcolor="#ffcccc"
| 4
| April 24
| Dallas
| L 96–107
| Jack Sikma (27)
| Jack Sikma (14)
| Gus Williams (9)
| Kingdome11,893
| 2–2
|- align="center" bgcolor="#ffcccc"
| 5
| April 26
| @ Dallas
| L 104–105 (OT)
| Gus Williams (27)
| Danny Vranes (11)
| Gus Williams (14)
| Moody Coliseum9,007
| 2–3
|-

Player stats

Season

Awards and records
1984 NBA All-Star Game selections (game played on January 29, 1984)
 Jack Sikma

Transactions

Subtractions

References

See also
 1983–84 NBA season

Seattle SuperSonics seasons
Sea